Balivada Kanta Rao (3 July 1927 – 6 May 2000) was a noted Telugu novelist and playwright.

He was born in Madapam village in Srikakulam District of Andhra Pradesh, he worked in various capacities as civilian officer in the Indian Navy. He has to his credit 38 major and minor novels, 400 short stories, 5 major plays, host of playlets and radio plays and travelogues.

Many of his novels and stories have been translated into other Indian languages. He won several awards which include Andhra Pradesh Sahitya Akademi, Telugu University Award, Gopichand Literary award, Ravi Shastri Memorial Award and Kalasagar Vishishta Puraskaram. He was the winner of Kendriya Sahitya Akademi Award in 1998 by the Government of India.

Novels and novelettes

Balivada's published repertoire includes 38 major and minor novels. Many of his works have been translated into Hindi, Gujarati, Kannada and other Indian languages. Some of his works are:

Sharada (1947)
Parajayam (1949).
Annapurna (1950)
Buchi (1950)
Suguna (1951)
Godameeda Bomma (1953)
Dagapadina Tammudu (1957)
Matsyagandhi (1962)
Sampangi (1970)
Nalugu Manchalu (1966)
Punyabhumi (1969)
Ide Narakam Ide Swargam (1974)
Vamsadhara (1982)
Delhi Majlilu (1984)
Chaitra Parvam (1977)
Love in Goa (1984)
Maro Rajasekhara Charitra (1986)
Ajanta (1986)
Ellora (1988)
Ammi and Janmabhoomi (2003. Published Posthumously)

Apart from the novels, 400 short stories, 8 Plays, travelogues, essays have been published and staged. Many of his plays were broadcast on All India Radio and Doordarshan. Five anthologies of his stories and one anthology of six small novellas have been published

References

Further reading
The Secret of Contentment and Other Telugu Short Stories. Translated by Sujata Patnaik., 2002. 
Monsoon Showers in Goa & The Mythical Mermaid- Two Novellas. Translated by Sujata Patnaik., 2014. Published by Sahitya Akademi. 
AVKF.Balivada Kanta Rao.

20th-century Indian novelists
Recipients of the Sahitya Akademi Award in Telugu
1927 births
2000 deaths
People from Srikakulam
Telugu writers
20th-century Indian dramatists and playwrights
People from Srikakulam district
Novelists from Andhra Pradesh
Dramatists and playwrights from Andhra Pradesh
People from Uttarandhra